Svetlana Aleksandrovna Lunkina (born 29 July 1979) is a Russian-Canadian ballerina who is a principal dancer with the National Ballet of Canada.

Biography
Lunkina was born in Moscow and attended the Moscow Choreographic Academy. Upon her graduation in 1997, she joined the Bolshoi Ballet. During her first season at the Bolshoi Theatre, she was chosen to perform the title role in Giselle and thus, at the age of 18, became the youngest Giselle in the history of the Bolshoi.

Over her 15-year career with the company, Lunkina danced many leading roles in both classical and contemporary ballets. In 2001, she was a Triumph Youth Award recipient, and the following year, Alexander Grant set the role of Lise in Frederick Ashton's La Fille mal gardée on her. Later, she worked extensively with Roland Petit, who gave her the roles of Liza in La Dame de Pique and Esmeralda in Notre-Dame de Paris in their Bolshoi premieres. She also performed his La Rose Malade, which Petit updated for Lunkina for the first time since Maya Plisetskaya danced it. She was promoted to the rank of principal dancer in 2005. Lunkina was awarded Brilliance of the 21st Century award the same year. In 2010, she was awarded with the prize Ballerina of the Decade, along with the three other well-known ballerinas: Diana Vishneva, Alina Cojocaru and Lucia Lacarra. During her career, she also performed in such ballets as The Nutcracker, Don Quixote and The Sleeping Beauty, and appeared at such theatres as the Berlin and Vienna State Operas, and with the Paris Opera Ballet, among others.

In 2002, Lunkina played one of the main characters in the feature film St.Petersburg-Cannes Express, by the American director John Daly; the world premiere screening took place in 2003 in Palm Springs, California. In 2004, the Japanese portrait photographer Eichiro Sakata, included Lunkina in his photo gallery called "Piercing the Sky" as an outstanding contemporary personality. In 2013, Lunkina became the main attraction and the “objet d'art” of a European art exhibit, created by the artist Anna Gaskell.

Lunkina joined the National Ballet of Canada as a principal guest artist in August 2013 and as a permanent principal dancer the following year. In 2014, she was invited as a guest dancer in South Korea, and in April 2015 she performed in Taiwan.

Lunkina is the artistic director of the Canada All Star Ballet Gala. Its first performance took place on 11 February 2017 at the Sony Centre for the Performing Arts in Toronto, featuring principal dancers from American Ballet Theatre, the Bolshoi Ballet, Rome Opera Ballet, Royal Ballet, Royal Danish Ballet, San Francisco Ballet, Stuttgart Ballet and the National Ballet of Canada.

Personal life
Lunkina is married to Russian producer Vladislav Moskalev and has two children: Maxim, born in January 2004, and Eva, born in April 2009.

Repertoire
La Sylphide (choreography by August Bournonville): Sylph
La Sylphide (choreography by Johan Kobborg, after August Bournonville): Sylph
Giselle (choreography by Vladimir Vasiliev, after Jean Coralli and Jules Perrot): Giselle
Giselle (choreography by Yuri Grigorovich, after Jean Coralli and Jules Perrot): Giselle
Giselle (choreography by Ray Barra, after Jean Coralli and Jules Perrot): Giselle
Giselle (choreography by Carla Fracci, after Jean Coralli and Jules Perrot): Giselle
Giselle (choreography by Peter Wright, after Jean Coralli and Jules Perrot): Giselle
Swan Lake (choreography by Yuri Grigorovich, after Marius Petipa and Lev Ivanov):  Odette-Odile, Russian Bride
Swan Lake (choreography by Ray Barra, after Marius Petipa and Lev Ivanov): Odette-Odile
Swan Lake (choreography by James Kudelka, after Marius Petipa and Lev Ivanov): Odette-Odile
Swan Lake (choreography by Kyozo Mitani and Terry Westmoreland, after Marius Petipa and Lev Ivanov): Odette-Odile
Swan Lake (produced by Karen Kain, after Marius Petipa and Lev Ivanov, with additional choreography by Erik Bruhn, Robert Binet and Christopher Stowell): Odette-Odile
The Sleeping Beauty (choreography by Yuri Grigorovich, after Marius Petipa): Princess Aurora, Fairy of Tenderness, Silver Fairy
The Sleeping Beauty (choreography by Rudolf Nureyev, after Marius Petipa): Princess Aurora
The Nutcracker (choreography by Yuri Grigorovich): Marie
The Nutcracker (choreography by Rudolf Nureyev): Clara
The Nutcracker (choreography by James Kudelka): Sugar Plum Fairy, Snow Queen
Don Quixote (choreography by Alexei Fadeyechev, after Marius Petipa and Alexander Gorsky): Kitri
La Bayadère (choreography by Yuri Grigorovich, after Marius Petipa): Nikiya, D'Jampe
Le Corsaire (choreography by Alexei Ratmansky and Yuri Burlaka, after Marius Petipa): Medora
Raymonda (choreography by Carla Fracci, after Marius Petipa): Raymonda
Esmeralda (choreography by Yuri Burlaka and Vasily Medvedev, after Marius Petipa): Esmeralda
La Fille mal gardée (choreography by Frederick Ashton): Lise
La Fille du Pharaon (choreography by Pierre Lacotte, after Marius Petipa) : Aspicia
Notre-Dame de Paris (choreography by Roland Petit): Esmeralda (first interpreter at the Bolshoi)
Spartacus (choreography by Yuri Grigorovich): Phrygia
Anyuta (choreography by Vladimir Vasiliev): Anyuta
Onegin (choreography by John Cranko): Tatiana
Manon (choreography by Kenneth MacMillan): Lescaut's Mistress
Nijinsky (choreography by John Neumeier): Romola de Pulszky, Eleonora Bereda
A Streetcar Named Desire (choreography by John Neumeier): Blanche DuBois
Anna Karenina (choreography: John Neumeier): Anna Karenina (first interpreter at the National Ballet of Canada) 
Illusions perdues (choreography by Alexei Ratmansky): Coralie
The Bright Stream (choreography by Alexei Ratmansky): Zina
Romeo and Juliet (choreography by Alexei Ratmansky): Juliet
Alice's Adventures in Wonderland (choreography by Christopher Wheeldon): Alice's Mother/Queen of Hearts
The Winter's Tale (choreography by Christopher Wheeldon): Paulina
Le Petit Prince (choreography by Guillaume Côté): The Snake
MADDADDAM (choreography by Wayne McGregor): Oryx
Asuka (choreography by Asami Maki): Sugaru-Otome
Le Jeune Homme et la Mort (choreography by Roland Petit): la Mort
La Dame de Pique (choreography by Roland Petit): Liza (first interpreter at the Bolshoi)
Carmen Suite (choreography by Alberto Alonso): Carmen
The Lesson (choreography by Flemming Flindt): Pupil
Les Sylphides (called Chopiniana in the Bolshoi production, choreography by Michel Fokine): Prelude and 7th Waltz
Le Spectre de la Rose (choreography by Michel Fokine)
The Dying Swan (choreography by Michel Fokine)
Gaîté Parisienne (choreography by Léonide Massine): Glove Seller (first interpreter at the Bolshoi)
Les Présages (choreography by Léonide Massine): Passion
Apollo (choreography by George Balanchine): Terpsichore
Serenade (choreography by George Balanchine)
Symphony in C (choreography by George Balanchine): First Movement, Second Movement
The Four Temperaments (choreography by George Balanchine): Sanguinic
Jewels (choreography by George Balanchine): "Diamonds"
Pas de Quatre (choreography by Anton Dolin)
Afternoon of a Faun (choreography by Jerome Robbins): Young Girl (first interpreter at the Bolshoi)
La Rose Malade (choreography by Roland Petit)
Passacaille (choreography by Roland Petit): soloist (first interpreter at the Bolshoi)
Concerto (choreography by Kenneth MacMillan): Second Movement
Elite Syncopations (choreography by Kenneth MacMillan): Stop-Time Rag
Sentimental Waltz (choreography by Vladimir Vasiliev)
Petite Mort (choreography by Jiří Kylián)
Jeu de cards (choreography by Alexei Ratmansky)
Piano Concerto no. 1 (choreography by Alexei Ratmansky)
After the Rain (choreography by Christopher Wheeldon): Third Couple
Misericordes (choreography by Christopher Wheeldon; world premiere)
Chroma (choreography by Wayne McGregor)
Genus (choreography by Wayne McGregor)
Dream of Dream (choreography by Jorma Elo; world premiere)
…black night's bright day  (choreography by James Kudelka)
Emergence (choreography by Crystal Pite)
Angels' Atlas (choreography by Crystal Pite)
Unearth (choreography by Robert Binet)
The Dreamers Ever Leave You (choreography by Robert Binet)
Being and Nothingness (choreography by Guillaume Côté; world premiere)
Dark Angels (choreography by Guillaume Côté; world premiere)
On Solid Ground (choreography by Siphesihle November)

Filmography
Giselle (choreography by Vladimir Vasiliev), with Nikolay Tsiskaridze, Maria Alexandrova, Bolshoi Theatre, 1998
La Dame de Pique (choreography by Roland Petit), with  Nikolay Tsiskaridze, Ilze Liepa, Bolshoi Theatre, 2001
Passacaille (choreography by Roland Petit), Bolshoi Theatre, 2001
Notre-Dame de Paris (choreography by Roland Petit), with  Nikolay Tsiskaridze, Bolshoi Theatre, 2003
Strictly Bolshoi (documentary includes a complete performance of Christopher Wheeldon's Misericordes), 2007
Giselle (choreography by Yuri Grigorovich), with  Dmitry Gudanov, Maria Allash, Bolshoi Theatre, 2011
Le Corsaire (choreography by Alexei Ratmansky and Yuri Burlaka after Marius Petipa), with Ruslan Skvortsov, Bolshoi Theatre, 2012
The Bright Stream (choreography by Alexei Ratmansky), with Mikhail Lobukhin, Maria Alexandrova, Ruslan Skvortsov, Bolshoi Theatre, 2012
Apollo (choreography by George Balanchine), with Brendan Saye, Jeannine Haller, Calley Skalnik, National Ballet of Canada, 2021

See also
List of Russian ballet dancers

References

External links
Lunkina's page on the website Bolshoi Theatre
Lunkina's page on the website National Ballet of Canada

1979 births
Living people
Russian ballerinas
Prix Benois de la Danse winners
Bolshoi Ballet principal dancers
Dancers from Moscow
Honored Artists of the Russian Federation
National Ballet of Canada principal dancers
20th-century Russian ballet dancers
21st-century Russian ballet dancers
Russian expatriates in Canada
Prima ballerinas